The 2011–12 Albany Great Danes men's basketball team represented the University at Albany, SUNY during the 2011–12 NCAA Division I men's basketball season. The Great Dames, led by 11th year head coach Will Brown, played their home games at SEFCU Arena and are members of the America East Conference. They finished the season 19–15, 9–7 in America East play to finish in fourth place. They lost in the semifinals of the America East Basketball tournament to Stony Brook. They were invited to the 2012 CollegeInsider.com Tournament where they lost in the first round to Manhattan.

Roster

Schedule

|-
!colspan=12 style=|Exhibition Tour of Canada

|-
!colspan=12 style=|Regular Season

|-
!colspan=12 style=|America East tournament 

|-
!colspan=12 style=| CollegeInsider.com Postseason Tournament

References

Albany Great Danes men's basketball seasons
Albany
Albany
Albany Great Danes men's basketball
Albany Great Danes men's basketball